The Jiajing Emperor (16September 150723January 1567) was the 12th Emperor of the Ming dynasty, reigning from 1521 to 1567. Born Zhu Houcong, he was the former Zhengde Emperor's cousin. His father, Zhu Youyuan (1476–1519), Prince of Xing, was the fourth son of the Chenghua Emperor (reigned from 1464 to 1487) and the eldest son of three sons born to the emperor's concubine, Lady Shao. The Jiajing Emperor's era name, "Jiajing", means "admirable tranquility".

Early years
Born as heir apparent of a vassal prince, Zhu Houcong was not brought up to succeed to the throne. However, the throne became vacant in 1521 after the sudden death of the Hongzhi Emperor's son, the Zhengde Emperor, who did not leave an heir. Prior to the Zhengde Emperor's death, the line of succession was as follows:

  Zhu Jianshen, the Chenghua Emperor (1447–1487)
 Unnamed son (1466–1466)
 Zhu Youji (1469–1472)
  Zhu Youcheng, the Hongzhi Emperor (1470–1505)
  Zhu Houzhao, the Zhengde Emperor (1491–1521)
  Zhu Houwei, Prince Dao of Wei (1496–1497, title posthumously)
 Zhu Youyuan, Prince Xian of Xing (1476–1519)  Zhu Houxi, Prince Huai of Yue (1500–1500, title posthumously) '''(1) Zhu Houcong, Prince of Xing (b. 1507) The 13-year-old Zhu Houcong, then heir presumptive, succeeded to the throne, and so relocated from his father's princedom (near present-day Zhongxiang, Hubei) to the capital, Beijing. As the Jiajing Emperor, Zhu Houcong had his parents posthumously elevated to an "honorary" imperial rank, and had an imperial-style Xianling Mausoleum built for them near Zhongxiang.

Reign as emperor

Custom dictated that an emperor who was not an immediate descendant of the previous one should be adopted by the previous one, to maintain an unbroken line. Such a posthumous adoption of Zhu Houcong by the Hongzhi Emperor was proposed, but he resisted, preferring instead to have his father declared emperor posthumously. This conflict is known as the "Great Rites Controversy." The Jiajing Emperor prevailed and hundreds of his opponents were banished, flogged in the imperial court, or executed. Among the banished was the poet Yang Shen.

The Jiajing Emperor was known to be intelligent and efficient; whilst later he went on strike, and choose not to attend any state meetings, he did not neglect the paperwork and other governmental matters. The Jiajing Emperor was also known to be a cruel and self-aggrandizing emperor and he also chose to reside outside of the Forbidden City in Beijing so he could live in isolation. Ignoring state affairs, the Jiajing Emperor relied on Zhang Cong and Yan Song to handle affairs of state. In time, Yan Song and his son Yan Shifan – who gained power only as a result of his father's political influence – came to dominate the whole government even being called the "First and Second Prime Minister". Ministers such as Hai Rui and Yang Jisheng challenged and even chastised Yan Song and his son but were thoroughly ignored by the emperor. Hai Rui and many ministers were eventually dismissed or executed. The Jiajing Emperor also abandoned the practice of seeing his ministers altogether from 1539 onwards, and for a period of almost 25 years refused to give official audiences, choosing instead to relay his wishes through eunuchs and officials. Only Yan Song, a few handful of eunuchs and Daoist priests ever saw the emperor. This eventually led to corruption at all levels of the Ming government. However, the Jiajing Emperor was intelligent and managed to control the court.

The Ming dynasty had enjoyed a long period of peace, but in 1542 the Mongol leader Altan Khan began to harass China along the northern border. In 1550, he even reached the suburbs of Beijing. Eventually the Ming government appeased him by granting special trading rights. The Ming government also had to deal with wokou pirates attacking the southeastern coastline.
Starting in 1550, Beijing was enlarged by the addition of the outer city. 

Palace plot of Renyin year

Due to the Jiajing Emperor's cruelty and promiscuous lifestyle, his concubines and palace maids plotted to assassinate him in October 1542 by strangling him while he slept. His pursuit of eternal life led him to believe that one of the elixirs of extending his life was to force virgin palace maids to collect menstrual blood for his consumption. These arduous tasks were performed non-stop even when the palace maids were taken ill and any unwilling participants were executed on the Emperor's whim. A group of palace maids who had had enough of the emperor's cruelty decided to band together to murder him in an event known as the Palace plot of Renyin year. The lead palace maid tried to strangle the emperor with ribbons from her hair while the others held down the emperor's arms and legs but made a fatal mistake by tying a knot around the emperor's neck which would not tighten. Meanwhile, some of the young palace maids involved began to panic and one (Zhang Jinlian) ran to the empress. The plot was exposed and on the orders of the empress and some officials, all of the palace maids involved, including the emperor's favourite concubine (Consort Duan) and another concubine (Consort Ning, née Wang), were ordered to be executed by slow slicing and their families were killed. The Jiajing Emperor later determined that Consort Duan had been innocent, and dictated that their daughter, Luzheng, be raised by Imperial Noble Consort Shen.

Taoist pursuits
The Jiajing Emperor was a devoted follower of Taoism and attempted to suppress Buddhism. After the assassination attempt in 1542, the emperor moved out of the imperial palace, and lived with a small, thin, 13-year-old girl who was able to satisfy his sexual appetite (Lady Shan). The Jiajing Emperor began to pay excessive attention to his Taoist pursuits while ignoring his imperial duties. He built three Taoist temples: Temple of the Sun, Temple of the Earth and Temple of the Moon, and extended the Temple of Heaven by adding the Earthly Mount. Over the years, the emperor's devotion to Taoism was to become a heavy financial burden for the Ming government and create dissent across the country.

Particularly during his later years, the Jiajing Emperor was known for spending a great deal of time on alchemy in hopes of finding medicines to prolong his life. He would forcibly recruit young women in their early teens and engage in sexual activities in the hope of empowering himself, along with the consumption of potent elixirs. He employed Taoist priests to collect rare minerals from all over the country to create elixirs, including elixirs containing mercury, which inevitably posed health problems at high doses.

Legacy and death

After 45 years on the throne (the second longest reign in the Ming dynasty), the Jiajing Emperor died in 1567 – possibly due to mercury overdose from Chinese alchemical elixir poisoning – and was succeeded by his son, the Longqing Emperor. Though his long rule gave the dynasty an era of stability, the Jiajing Emperor's neglect of his official duties resulted in the decline of the dynasty at the end of the 16th century. His style of governance, or the lack thereof, would be emulated by his grandson later in the century.

The time when the Jiajing Emperor was buried was very close to the time of completion of the manuscript copy of the lost Yongle Encyclopedia. The Jiajing Emperor died in December 1566, but was buried three months later, in March 1567. One possibility is that they were waiting for the manuscript to be completed.

Portrayal in art

The Jiajing Emperor was portrayed in contemporary court portrait paintings, as well as in other works of art. For example, in this panoramic painting below, the Jiajing Emperor can be seen in the right half riding a black steed and wearing a plumed helmet. He is distinguished from his entourage of bodyguards as an abnormally tall figure.

FamilyConsorts and Issue:' Empress Xiaojiesu, of the Chen clan (1508–1528)
miscarriage (1528)
 Deposed Empress, of the Zhang clan (d. 1537), personal name Zhang Qijie
 Empress Xiaolie, of the Fang clan (1516–1547)
 Empress  Xiaoke, of the Du clan (d. 1554)
 Zhu Zaihou, the Longqing Emperor (4 March 1537 – 5 July 1572), third son
 Imperial Noble Consort Duanhegongrongshunwenxi, of the Wang clan (d. 1553)
 Zhu Zairui, Crown Prince Zhuangjing (1536–1549), second son
 Imperial Noble Consort Zhuangshunanrongzhenjing, of the Shen clan (d. 1581)
 Imperial Noble Consort Ronganhuishunduanxi, of the Yan clan (d. 1541)
 Zhu Zaiji, Crown Prince Aichong (7 September 1533 – 27 October 1533), first son
 Noble Consort Gongxizhenjing, of the Wen clan
 Noble Consort Rong'an, of the Ma clan
 Noble Consort, of the Zhou clan (d. 1540)
 Consort Daoyingong, of the Wen clan (d. 1532)
 Consort Duan, of the Cao clan (d. 1542)
 Zhu Shaoying, Princess Chang'an (1536–1549), first daughter
 Zhu Luzheng, Princess Ning'an (1539–1607), third daughter
 Married Li He in 1555, and had issue (one son)
 Consort Huairongxian, of the Zheng clan (d. 1536)
 Consort Jing, of the Lu clan (d. 1588)
 Zhu Zaizhen, Prince Gong of Jing (29 March 1537 – 9 February 1565), fourth son
 Consort Su, of the Jiang clan
 Zhu Zaishang, Prince Shang of Ying (8 September 1537 – 9 September 1537), fifth son
 Consort Yi, of the Zhao clan (d. 1569)
 Zhu Zai, Prince Huai of Qi (1 October 1537 – 5 August 1538), sixth son
 Consort Yong, of the Chen clan (d. 1586)
 Zhu Zaikui, Prince Ai of Ji (29 January 1538 – 14 February 1538), seventh son
 Zhu Ruirong, Princess Guishan (1541–1544), fourth daughter
 Consort Hui, of the Wang clan
 Zhu Fuyuan, Princess Sirou (1538–1549), second daughter
 Consort Rong, of the Zhao clan
 Zhu Zaifeng, Prince Si of Jun (23 August 1539 – 16 April 1540), eighth son
 Consort Rongzhaode, of the Zhang clan (d. 1574)
 Zhu Suzhen, Princess Jiashan (1541–1564), fifth daughter
 Married Xu Congcheng in 1559
 Consort Rong'anzhen, of the Ma clan (d. 1564)
 Consort Duanjingshu, of the Zhang clan
 Consort Gongxili, of the Wang clan (d. 1553)
 Consort Gongshurong, of the Yang clan (d. 1566)
 Consort Duanhuiyong, of the Xu clan
 Concubine Ning, of the Wang clan (王宁嫔) d. 1542), head of the Renyin plot

Ancestry

See also
 Chinese emperors family tree (late)

References

Further reading
 Fisher, Carney T. "Smallpox, Salesmen, and Sectarians: Ming-Mongol Relations in the Jiajing Reign (1522–67)." Ming Studies 1988.1 (1988): 1-23.
 Mote, F.W. Imperial China 900–1800 (1999) pp 660–72.
 Wan, Maggie CK. "Building an Immortal Land: The Ming Jiajing Emperor's West Park." Asia Major (2009): 65-99. online
 The Cambridge History of China, Vol. 7: The Ming Dynasty, 1368–1644, Part I,'' "The Prince of Ning Treason" by Frederick W. Mote and Denis Twitchett.
 Huiping Pang, "The Confiscating Henchmen: The Masquerade of Ming Embroidered-Uniform Guard Liu Shouyou (ca. 1540-1604)," Ming Studies 72 (2015): 24-45. ISSN 0147-037X

1507 births
1567 deaths
Ming dynasty emperors
16th-century Chinese monarchs
People from Xiaogan